Evangelia Xinou (born November 22, 1981 in Athens) is a female Greek race walker. She is a four-time national champion (2005–2008) for the 20 km race walk
.

Xinou represented Greece at the 2008 Summer Olympics in Beijing, where she competed for the women's 20 km race walk, along with her compatriots Despina Zapounidou and Athanasia Tsoumeleka, who later disqualified from the event because of doping charges. Despite of the tumultuous weather, she finished the race in twenty-fifth place by three seconds behind Romania's Ana Maria Groza, with a personal best time of 1:32:19.

References

External links

NBC 2008 Olympics profile

1981 births
Living people
Greek female racewalkers
Olympic athletes of Greece
Athletes (track and field) at the 2008 Summer Olympics
Athletes from Athens